The Osmonds is a musical based on the life and music of The Osmonds. The musical's story is by Jay Osmond and features a book by Julian Bigg and Shaun Kerrison.

Synopsis 
The musical tells the story of the five Osmond brothers, Alan, Wayne, Merrill, Jay and Donny from Utah in the 1970s who formed The Osmonds band selling 100 million records and winning 59 Gold and Platinum awards.

Production

UK and Ireland tour (2022) 
The musical had its world premiere at the Curve Theatre, Leicester on 3 February 2022 before touring the UK and Ireland until December 2022. The production is directed by Shaun Kerrison and features choreography by Bill Deamer, with Musical Supervision/Arrangements by Julian Bigg and Rich Morris. The musical was due to premiere in August 2021, however was postponed due to the COVID-19 pandemic. On 12 October 2021, the lead casting was announced. Full casting was announced on 11 January 2022.

Musical numbers 
The musical features songs made famous by The Osmonds, including;

 "Love Me for a Reason"
 "Crazy Horses"
 "Let Me In"
 "Puppy Love"
 "One Bad Apple"
 "Long Haired Lover from Liverpool"
 "Paper Roses"
 "Yo-Yo"
 "Through the Years"
 "Down by the Lazy River"
 "Having a Party"

Cast and characters

External links 
 Official website
 Julian Bigg

References 

Jukebox musicals
Musicals inspired by real-life events
Cultural depictions of pop musicians
British musicals
Osmond family (show business)
2022 musicals